Carmen Capurro is a former U.S. soccer player who earned two caps with the U.S. national team in 1973.  His first game with the national team in a 1-0 loss to Poland on August 3, 1973 when he came on for Dan Califano in the 65th minute.  His second game was two days later, a 2-0 win over Canada.  He came on for Mark Liveric.

References

American soccer players
United States men's international soccer players
Living people
Association footballers not categorized by position
Year of birth missing (living people)